Alberto Carlieri (1672-after 1720) was an Italian painter of the late-Baroque period. He was born at Rome, where he was first a pupil of Giuseppe Marchi, but afterwards of Andrea Pozzo. He excelled in painting quadratura.

References

1672 births
1720s deaths
Painters from Rome
17th-century Italian painters
Italian male painters
18th-century Italian painters
Italian Baroque painters
Quadratura painters
18th-century Italian male artists